This list of churches in Egedal Municipality lists church buildings in Egedal Municipality, Denmark.

List

See also
 Listed buildings in Gribskov Municipality
 List of churches in Helsingør Municipality
 List of churches in Hillerød Municipality

References

External links

 Nordens kirker: Nordsjælland

Churches
Egedal